Ufimsky (masculine), Ufimskaya (feminine), or Ufimskoye (neuter) is the name of several rural localities in Russia:
Ufimsky, Republic of Bashkortostan, a rural locality (a selo) in the Republic of Bashkortostan
Ufimsky, Sverdlovsk Oblast, a former urban-type settlement in Sverdlovsk Oblast, since 2004—a rural locality (a settlement)

References